Wilfred Kareng (born 25 April 1946) is a Botswana hurdler. He competed in the men's 400 metres hurdles at the 1980 Summer Olympics.

References

External links
 

1946 births
Living people
Athletes (track and field) at the 1974 British Commonwealth Games
Athletes (track and field) at the 1980 Summer Olympics
Botswana male hurdlers
Olympic athletes of Botswana
Place of birth missing (living people)
Commonwealth Games competitors for Botswana